In philately, a line pair is a coil pair of postage stamps bearing an inked line between the two stamps. There are at least two kinds of these:
A guide line pair has a guide line between the stamps. Since the guide lines are deliberately incised into the plate, they will generally be sharp and clear.
A joint line pair has a joint line between the stamps, deriving from the seam in the cylindrical plate used to print the stamps. These lines are somewhat smeared in appearance.

Philatelic terminology